Events in the year 1969 in Germany.

Incumbents
President
Heinrich Lübke (until 30 June 1969)
Gustav Heinemann (from 1 July 1969)
Chancellor
Kurt Georg Kiesinger (until 21 October 1969)
Willy Brandt (from 21 October 1969)

Events
 22 February - Germany in the Eurovision Song Contest 1969
 5 March - 1969 West German presidential election
 23 June - Bonn Agreement
 25 June - 26 July - 19th Berlin International Film Festival
 5 September - Bielefeld University was established.
 28 September - 1969 West German federal election
 22 October - The First Brandt cabinet led by Willy Brandt was sworn in.

Births
 January 3 – Michael Schumacher, racing driver
 January 15 – Meret Becker, actress
 January 24 – Annette Klug, fencer
 March 28 – Ilke Wyludda, discus thrower
 April 11 – Caren Miosga, journalist
 April 20 – Marietta Slomka, journalist
 May 14 –  Sabine Schmitz, racing driver and television personality (died 2021)
 May 25 –  Jörg Roßkopf,  table tennis player 
 June 14 – Steffi Graf, tennis player
 June 15 – Oliver Kahn, football player
 July 5 – Ansgar Brinkmann, politician
 July 16 – Sahra Wagenknecht, politician
 July 19 – Sabine Bau, fencer
 July 21 – Isabell Werth, equestrian
 July 22 – Ronny Weller, weightlifter
 August 3 –  Ingo Oschmann, comedian
 August 21 –  Oliver Geissen, television presenter
 August 28 – Christoph Ahlhaus, politician
 September 9 – Sandra Wagner-Sachse, archer
 October 1 – Thorsten Schäfer-Gümbel, politician
 October 9 – Torsten May, boxer
 October 19 – Dieter Thoma, ski jumper
 November 22 – Katrin Krabbe, athlete
 December 22 – Eyck Zimmer, chef
 December 25 – AnNa R., singer

Deaths
January 13 - Helmut Weiss, German film director (born 1907)
February 18 - Gisela Arendt, German swimmer (born 1918)
February 22 - Johannes Dieckmann, German politician (born 1893)
February 26 - Karl Jaspers, German psychiatrist and philosopher (born 1883)
March 7 - Wilhelm von Apell, German general (born 1892)
April 21 - Rudolf Amelunxen, German politician (born 1888)
May 2 - Franz von Papen, German politician, Chancellor of Germany (born 1879)
July 5 - Walter Gropius, German architect (born 1883)
July 25 - Otto Dix, German painter (born 1891)
 5 August — Duke Adolf Friedrich of Mecklenburg, German nobleman, explorer and politician (born 1873)
August 6 - Theodor W. Adorno, German philosopher (born 1903)
August 8 - Otmar Freiherr von Verschuer, German physician (born 1896)
August 17 
 Ludwig Mies van der Rohe, German architect (born 1886)
 Otto Stern, German physicist and Nobel laureate in Physics (born 1888)
October 22 - Fritz Steinhoff, German politician (born 1897)
November 6 - Max Knoll, German electrical engineer (born 1897)
November 25 - Hans Reiter, German physician (born 1881)
December 2 - Otto Dix, German painter (born 1891)
December 5 - Claude Dornier, German airplane builder (born 1884)
December 8 - Karl Fiehler, German politician (born 1895)
December 19 - Rolf Dahlgrün, German politician (born 1908)
December 22 - Armin von Gerkan, German archaeologist (born 1885)

See also
 1969 in German television

References

 
Years of the 20th century in Germany
1960s in Germany
Germany
Germany